Jennifer Noel Wyatt (born December 10, 1965) is a Canadian professional golfer who formerly toured on the LPGA Tour.

Wyatt was born in Vancouver, British Columbia and starting playing golf at an early age in Richmond, British Columbia out of the Quilchena Golf & Country Club In 1983 she was the medalist at the 1983 Women's Western Junior Golf Championship and in 1984 she was the British Columbia Junior champion and ranked as the second best junior golfer in Canada. From 1985–1987, she was the number one ranked player in Canada. In 1987, she was a member of the gold-medal winning team at the Commonwealth Games in Christchurch, New Zealand. She attended Lamar University on a full scholarship and played on the Lamar golf team in the NCAA for five years before graduating in 1988 with a degree in Graphic Design.

Wyatt joined the LPGA Tour in 1989 after qualifying on her first try, and played on tour until 1998. During her 10 years on tour she won one tournament, made US$372,471, and was the ranked the 7th best putter in 1996 and the 4th best in sand saves in the same year.

In the off-season, she competed on the ALPG Tour (Australian Ladies Professional Golf Tour) from 1988 to 1995. She had one win on the ALPG tour and nine top-10 finishes in her eight seasons on the tour. Her career low round in tournament play is a 66 at the 1991 Orix Hawaiian Ladies Open at Ko Olina Golf Club in Kapolei, Hawaii.

She has worked as a broadcast commentator for both CBC Sports and CTV Sports during televised golf events.

In 2003, she finished in first place in the 2003 BMO Financial Group Canadian Women's Tour Order of Merit.

Professional wins

LPGA Tour wins

ALPG Tour wins
1991 Heart Health Women's Open

Other wins
2001 BC PGA Women's Championship
2002 BC PGA Women's Championship
2004 BC PGA Women's Championship
2005 BC PGA Women's Championship
2006 BC PGA Women's Championship
2009 BC PGA Women's Championship, Washington State Women's Open

External links
Jennifer Wyatt Golf Instruction Website

2004 Interview with Jennifer Wyatt

Canadian female golfers
Lamar Lady Cardinals golfers
ALPG Tour golfers
LPGA Tour golfers
Golfing people from British Columbia
Sportspeople from Vancouver
People from Richmond, British Columbia
1965 births
Living people